Spilosoma quadrimacula is a moth in the family Erebidae. It was described by Hervé de Toulgoët in 1977. It is found in Ethiopia.

References

Endemic fauna of Ethiopia
Moths described in 1977
quadrimacula